Russian route R23 or Pskov Highway  is a Russian federal motorway that runs from Saint Petersburg through Pskov until the border with Belarus. It is part of European route E95. Before 2018 the route was designated as M20. Since Soviet times it has sometimes been called "Kiev Highway".

References

Roads in Russia
Transport in Leningrad Oblast
European route E95